Charles Grave better known as Chas Grave (1886–1944) was an artist and cartoonist, working at various times for Punch Magazine, The Passing Show, Tatler and The Bystander. He concentrated on the marine world, portraying seafaring activities, including sailing, cruising and the lives of merchant seaman.

References

External links
Humour of the Great War
Gallery of cartoons

Punch (magazine) cartoonists